Dia Evtimova (born 30 April 1987) is a Bulgarian tennis player. On 31 October 2011, she reached a career-high WTA singles ranking of 145 whilst her best doubles ranking was 228 on 23 June 2014. 
She has more than 550 match wins on the pro circuit which puts her 42nd on the List of Open era and tenth among the active players. Evtimova also played for Bulgarian Fed Cup team, with a current 15–20 record.

Professional career
In 2010, she qualified for the Internationaux de Strasbourg where she was defeated by Maria Sharapova in the second round.

In 2011, she qualified for the Gastein Ladies and reached her first quarterfinal on the WTA Tour, before she was defeated by Patricia Mayr-Achleitner.

Grand Slam performance timeline

Singles

ITF Circuit finals

Singles: 26 (10 titles, 16 runner–ups)

Doubles: 32 (18 titles, 14 runner–ups)

Fed Cup participation
Dia Evtimova debuted for the Bulgaria Fed Cup team in 2007. Since then, she has a 7–13 singles record and an 8–7 doubles record (15–20 overall).

Singles (7–13)

Doubles (8–7)

References

External links

 
 
 

Living people
People from Haskovo
Bulgarian female tennis players
1987 births
Sportspeople from Sofia